The canton of La Vallée de la Barousse is an administrative division of the Hautes-Pyrénées department, southwestern France. It was created at the French canton reorganisation which came into effect in March 2015. Its seat is in Lannemezan.

It consists of the following communes:
 
Anères
Anla
Antichan
Arné
Aventignan
Aveux
Bertren
Bize
Bizous
Bramevaque
Campistrous
Cantaous
Cazarilh
Clarens
Créchets
Esbareich
Ferrère
Gaudent
Gembrie
Générest
Hautaget
Ilheu
Izaourt
Lagrange
Lannemezan
Lombrès
Loures-Barousse
Mauléon-Barousse
Mazères-de-Neste
Montégut
Montsérié
Nestier
Nistos
Ourde
Pinas
Réjaumont
Sacoué
Sainte-Marie
Saint-Laurent-de-Neste
Saint-Paul
Saléchan
Samuran
Sarp
Seich
Siradan
Sost
Tajan
Thèbe
Tibiran-Jaunac
Troubat
Tuzaguet
Uglas

References

Cantons of Hautes-Pyrénées